The Importance of Being Earnest is a filmed version of the 2011 Broadway revival production of Oscar Wilde's 1895 play of the same name. The film is directed by and stars Brian Bedford.

Production 
The 2011 Broadway revival of Earnest opened on January 13, 2011, at the Roundabout Theatre Company's American Airlines Theatre, following previews from December 17, 2010. After positive reviews  and several extensions, the production is set to close on July 3, 2011, bumping Roundabout's other project, People in the Picture, to Studio 54.

On March 1, 2011, it was reported that the production would be filmed live on March 11 and 12, 2011, to be shown in cinemas in June 2011. Official dates were announced on April 11, 2011: the first theaters to run The Importance of Being Earnest: Live in HD would do so on June 2, 2011.

Cast 
Brian Bedford as Lady Bracknell
Dana Ivey as Miss Prism
Paxton Whitehead as Rev. Canon Chasuble
David Furr as John Worthing
Santino Fontana as Algernon Moncrieff
Sara Topham as Gwendolen Fairfax
Charlotte Parry as Cecily Cardew
Paul O'Brien as Lane
Tim MacDonald as Merriman

References

External links 
 
 

2011 films
American comedy films
Films based on The Importance of Being Earnest
2011 comedy films
2010s English-language films
2010s American films